Lyta Alexander (/lit/ LEE-tah)[1] is a fictional character played by Patricia Tallman in the science fiction television series Babylon 5.

Role in Babylon 5

Character arc

In the series' pilot, Lyta is described as a sixth-generation telepath, but she points out that telepathy may have been running undetected in her family even earlier since telepaths were not monitored before that generation. In the series, it is stated that Lyta was trained by the Psi Corps and that she briefly interned with the Psi Cops division.  After an incident while accompanying Alfred Bester, she transferred to commercial work. In 2257, she was assigned as Babylon 5's first commercial telepath. Soon after arriving at the station, she scanned Vorlon Ambassador Kosh, in violation of the wishes of the Vorlon government, in order to try to discover the identity of his attacker.

In Season Two, Lyta's experience with the Vorlon ambassador permanently changed her, but many of the characters were altered, including Babylon 5's commander. Lyta, the telepath, was recalled from her assignment a few weeks later and questioned regarding her encounter with Kosh. Interrogated for months by the Psi Corps, she eventually escaped and joined the Mars Resistance. While underground, she uncovered information regarding a mole among the Babylon 5 command staff. She returned to the station in late 2259, where she revealed Talia Winters as an unwitting mole for secret forces in EarthGov and Psi Corps. 

In season 3, Lyta traveled to the Vorlon homeworld, one of the few known humans to do so and live. There, she was modified by the Vorlons and given gill-like implants to allow her to breathe in a Vorlon environment and the ability to "carry" a Vorlon consciousness. This tremendously increased her telepathic and psychokinetic powers beyond what she herself realized. She returned to Babylon 5 as an aide to Ambassador Kosh. 

In Season Four, Lyta was key to the eventual resolution of the Shadow War on Coriana 6, serving as the vessel through which Sheridan and Delenn confronted the elder races and forced them to leave the galaxy.  Immediately after the Shadow War, she was part of the expedition to the Shadows' homeworld of Z'ha'dum. Using unknown abilities and implanted instructions from the Vorlons, she triggered the destruction of the planet to spite Alfred Bester and prevent Shadow technology from falling into the wrong hands.  However, after the conclusion of the Shadow War, she found herself unwelcome and had difficulty finding employment. She would go on to play a decisive role in the endgame of the Earth Civil War, triggering the shadow-modified telepaths smuggled aboard Earth ships to disable the fleet at Mars. 

In Season Five, Lyta more thoroughly explored the abilities the Vorlons had given her. She was eventually arrested aboard Babylon 5 for supporting the "terrorism" of John Sheridan/ A deal was made with Michael Garibaldi to help her avoid prosecution and provide funding for her cause. Former Narn Ambassador G'Kar took her with him on a mission of exploration.

Characterization 

The character of Lyta Alexander has been subject to literary analysis, for example, in the dimension of feminine identity.

Conceptual history 

Lyta was introduced in the pilot episode "The Gathering" as a telepath assigned to the Babylon 5 space station by the Psi Corps, a fictional organization providing support to telepaths and monitoring their activity. However, she did not appear in the remainder of Season One due to a dispute concerning Tallman's salary. Lyta's role in the series was largely taken up by Andrea Thompson, who was cast as Talia Winters, a telepath who took over Lyta's responsibilities at the station. After Thompson left the series due to disagreements regarding the amount of screen time given to her character, Lyta returned as a recurring character in Seasons Two and Three after Capt. John Sheridan took over as station commander and became a regular cast member from Season Four on. Her character simply resumed the dramatic arc once intended for Thompson's.

Lyta does not appear in any of the canonical materials released since the end of the series. It is strongly implied in Crusade and some of the canonical novels that her actions (both on Babylon 5 in 2262 and afterward) led to the Telepath War of the mid-2260s, in which she was killed. According to Straczynski,  Lyta was intended to appear in the Crusade episode "The Path of Sorrows" as part of a flashback, but Tallman's salary negotiations failed. The scene as aired featured an unnamed telepath who died striking against the Psi Corps. Whether or not this was meant to be Lyta, Straczynski confirmed that she died in such an attack. In the aforementioned script book, Straczynski wrote that both Lyta and Lennier were killed in the explosion of Psi Corps Headquarters in a major battle of the Telepath War. Hints about her death had also been stated by Straczynski in posts to the Babylon 5 newsgroup  and in the final novel of the Psi Corps Trilogy by J. Gregory Keyes

Reception

References

Babylon 5 characters
Fictional telekinetics
Fictional telepaths
Fictional women soldiers and warriors
Television characters introduced in 1993